Madlur is a village in the Belgaum district of Karnataka State, India. The village is famous for its history and its also called Siddhabhoomi. The place was once ruled by the Chalukyas. The ancient village is rich with the architecture of the Chalukyas. The Historical name of the place is Shreerangapur. Shree Shiddeshwar temple and Koranar Bhavi are the major attractions. Other major attractions are Marakumb Kola and lake Maagani.

Demographics
Madlur is a large village located in Parasgad Taluka of Belgaum district, Karnataka with total 381 families residing. The Madlur village has population of 2090 of which 1071 are males while 1019 are females as per Population Census 2011.

In Madlur village population of children with age 0-6 is 315 which makes up 15.07 % of total population of village. Average Sex Ratio of Madlur village is 951 which is lower than Karnataka state average of 973. Child Sex Ratio for the Madlur as per census is 994, higher than Karnataka average of 948.Madlur village has lower literacy rate compared to Karnataka. In 2011, literacy rate of Madlur village was 59.61 % compared to 75.36 % of Karnataka. In Madlur Male literacy stands at 70.54 % while female literacy rate was 48.03 %.

Ratta's Sainika Thanas  also is an anthropological fact with some factors related to the Chalukya's also available in this village .Once upon time this is not village it's great commercial and Battlefield land.

Madlur Data 

As per constitution of India and Panchyati Raaj Act, Madlur village is administrated by Sarpanch (Head of Village) who is elected representative of village. Our website, don't have information about schools and hospital in Madlur village.

Caste Factor 
Schedule Caste (SC) constitutes 2.20 % while Schedule Tribe (ST) were 0.14 % of total population in Madlur village.

Work Profile 
In Madlur village out of total population, 1262 were engaged in work activities. 81.93 % of workers describe their work as Main Work (Employment or Earning more than 6 Months) while 18.07 % were involved in Marginal activity providing livelihood for less than 6 months. Of 1262 workers engaged in Main Work, 300 were cultivators (owner or co-owner) while 620 were Agricultural labourer.

References

Villages in Belagavi district